Synaphe bradleyalis is a species of moth of the family Pyralidae. It was described by Pierre Viette in 1960. It is found on Madagascar.

References

Moths described in 1960
Pyralini
Moths of Madagascar
Moths of Africa